General elections were held in Venezuela on 4 December 1983. The presidential elections were won by Jaime Lusinchi of Democratic Action, who received 56.7% of the vote, whilst his party won a majority of seats in the Chamber of Deputies and Senate.

Results

President

Congress

References

1983 in Venezuela
Venezuela
Elections in Venezuela
Presidential elections in Venezuela
Election and referendum articles with incomplete results